Musaeb Abdulrahman Balla (born 19 March 1989 in Khartoum) is a Sudanese-born Qatari middle-distance runner competing primarily in the 800 metres. He represented Qatar at the 2012 Summer Olympics as well as two outdoor and three indoor World Championships.

Competition record

1Representing Asia

2Disqualified in the final

Personal bests
Outdoor
 600 metres – 1:15.99 (Stockholm 2013)
 800 metres – 1:43.82 (Barcelona 2015)
Indoor
 600 metres – 1:15.83 (Moscow 2014)
 800 metres – 1:45.48 (Stockholm 2015)
 1000 metres – 2:21.71 (Birmingham 2011)

References

External links
  
 Musaeb Abdulrahman BALLA at All-Athletics.com

1989 births
Living people
Qatari male middle-distance runners
People from Khartoum
Olympic athletes of Qatar
Athletes (track and field) at the 2012 Summer Olympics
Asian Games medalists in athletics (track and field)
Athletes (track and field) at the 2010 Asian Games
Athletes (track and field) at the 2014 Asian Games
Qatari people of Sudanese descent
Sudanese emigrants to Qatar
Naturalised citizens of Qatar
World Athletics Championships athletes for Qatar
Asian Games bronze medalists for Qatar
Medalists at the 2010 Asian Games